Joe Vincent Meigs (October 24, 1892, Lowell, Massachusetts – October 24, 1963), was an American obstetrician and gynecologist.

Meigs was a grandson of Captain Joe Vincent Meigs, who invented an experimental steam monorail known as the Meigs single-track elevated railroad.

Meigs syndrome is named after him.

See also
 Mary Ann Vincent

References

External links

1892 births
1963 deaths
American obstetricians
American gynecologists